Kieran Bew (born 18 August 1980) is an English actor, known for portraying Alfonso, Duke of Calabria in Da Vinci's Demons for Starz,  Hans Christian Andersen: My Life as a Fairytale for Hallmark Entertainment and Gary Parr in Jimmy McGovern's BAFTA Award-winning The Street.  He has worked extensively in British theatre and television since graduating from LAMDA in 2001.

Background
Bew was born in Hartlepool, County Durham, England. He attended English Martyrs School and Sixth Form College. He trained at the London Academy of Music and Dramatic Art.
 
As a young fencer Bew won the under-16 and under-17 British épée titles, competed throughout Europe, and placed 21st at the Cadet World Championships in 1996. He also spent time in his childhood as a competitive swimmer and basketball player. He currently competes domestically for Haverstock fencing club.

In 1999 Bew worked as fight choreographer and captain for Mark Rylance's productions of Hamlet and Two Noble Kinsmen at Shakespeare's Globe Theatre in London.

Films and television

Bew frequently appears on British television and in independent films. 
On television Bew has appeared in Hustle and Spooks for BBC  and Crusoe for NBC.  He has also appeared in two Hallmark television films, Brush with Fate, alongside Ellen Burstyn and Kelly Macdonald, and Hans Christian Andersen, with Hugh Bonneville and James Fox.

In 2004, he played a football hooligan called Ike in the popular film Green Street alongside Elijah Wood and Charlie Hunnam.
In 2006, he played Gary Parr in Jimmy McGovern's The Street, alongside Matt Smith and Gina McKee. 
In 2008, he played the lead guitarist in the independent film 1234. 
In 2009, he appeared in the BBC Three drama Personal Affairs, playing Avi Gellman. 
In 2013 and 2014, he appeared as Detective Inspector Jack Burns in the BBC's daytime drama WPC 56.
In May 2017, he guest starred in series 10 of BBC1 series Doctor Who as Ivan in the 5th episode of the run "Oxygen".

In 2017, Kieran played the part of Ian in ITV mini series "Liar"

Stage work

Bew's stage work includes appearances in the following plays:
as Exton and Fitzwater in Richard II, directed by Trevor Nunn, at the Old Vic Theatre, 2005.
as Yakunin in The House of Special Purpose by Heidi Thomas, directed by Howard Davies, at the Minerva Theatre Chichester, 2009.
as Richard in Moscow Live by Serge Cartwright, directed by Jonathan Humphreys, at the HighTide Festival, 2010.
as The Men in The Knot of the Heart by David Eldridge, directed by Michael Attenborough, at the Almeida Theatre, 2011.
as Kent in Reasons to Be Pretty by Neil LaBute, directed by Michael Attenborough, at the Almeida Theatre, 2011–12.
as John in After Miss Julie by Patrick Marber, directed by Natalie Abrahami, at the Young Vic Theatre, 2012.
as Edmund in King Lear, directed by Michael Attenborough, at the Almeida Theatre, 2012.
as Laurent in Thérèse Raquin by Émile Zola, adapted by Helen Edmundson, directed by Jonathan Munby, at the Theatre Royal Bath, 2014.

In 2014 Bew appeared as Alfonso, Duke of Calabria in David S. Goyer's Da Vinci's Demons for Starz, and as Laurent in Thérèse Raquin for the Theatre Royal Bath.

Narration
Engineering The Impossible: Rome, National Geographic Channel and Channel 5, 2011
Engineering The Impossible: Egypt, National Geographic Channel and Channel 5, 2011
Rome Unwrapped (series)  National Geographic Channel and Channel 5, 2011
Strictly Baby Disco, Channel 4, 2011
24/7 Pet Hospital BBC1, 2023

Filmography

Television

Film

Video game

References

External links

Kieran Bew at http://sueterryvoices.com/profile/kieran-bew/
Hans Christian Andersen at RHI Entertainment 
Strictly Baby Disco http://www.channel4.com/programmes/strictly-baby-disco/4od
After Miss Julie Young Vic Theatre http://www.youngvic.org/whats-on/after-miss-julie
Et in Motorcadia Ego https://vimeo.com/79895013
Five Minutes http://fiveminutes.gs/

People from Hartlepool
Actors from County Durham
Alumni of the London Academy of Music and Dramatic Art
English male stage actors
English male television actors
English male film actors
1980 births
21st-century English male actors
Living people
People educated at English Martyrs School and Sixth Form College